Thomas Mannack (born in 1958) is a German classical archaeologist.

The thema of his dissertation was Beazleys spätere und späteste Manieristen. He is a specialist in the field of ancient ceramics. He is in charge of the Beazley Archive database and teaches classical iconography at the University of Oxford.

Writings 
 The Late Mannerists in Athenian Vase Painting. Oxford University Press, Oxford, 2001 (English version of the dissertation)
 Griechische Vasenmalerei. Eine Einführung. Thesis, Stuttgart 2002. , reviewed and bibliographically updated edition of Von Zabern, Darmstadt 2012.

References

External links 
 

Classical archaeologists
German archaeologists
Scholars of ancient Greek pottery
University of Kiel alumni
1958 births
Living people